Claude Desusclade (19 May 1919 – 15 April 2015) was a French swimmer. He competed in the men's 100 metre freestyle at the 1936 Summer Olympics.

References

External links
 

1919 births
2015 deaths
Olympic swimmers of France
Swimmers at the 1936 Summer Olympics
Place of birth missing
French male freestyle swimmers